The USRA 0-6-0 was a USRA standard class of steam locomotive designed under the control of the United States Railroad Administration, the nationalized railroad system in the United States during World War I.  This was the standard light switcher of the USRA types, and was of 0-6-0 wheel arrangement in the Whyte notation, or "C" in UIC classification.

A total of 255 locomotives were built under USRA control; these were sent to the following railroads:

After the dissolution of the USRA, the Atlantic Coast Line, Chicago, Burlington and Quincy, Chicago, St. Paul, Minneapolis and Omaha Railway, Gulf, Mobile and Ohio Railroad and Texas and Pacific Railway ordered additional copies of the USRA 0-6-0 design, while the Missouri Pacific Railroad and the Wheeling and Lake Erie Railway ordered only copies.

As of 2022, three USRA 0-6-0 copies are known to be preserved. Two are from the Wheeling and Lake Erie: 3960, which is awaiting a cosmetic restoration at the Age of Steam Roundhouse in Sugarcreek, Ohio, and 3984, which is undergoing an operational restoration at the Lorain and West Virginia Railway in Wellington, Ohio, and it is currently known as Nickel Plate Road 384. The third is 63, built by Alco in 1940 for the Alabama State Docks Commission. It has been on public display at the Kokosing Gap Trail in Mount Vernon, Ohio since 2002. 63 is currently in the best cosmetic shape of the three, but unfortunately, there are no plans to further restore it or make it operational.

There are also two operational 0-6-0s at Heritage Park in Calgary, Alberta, that are indirectly based on the USRA design. Although now known as Canadian Pacific 2023 and 2024, they were never actually owned by the Canadian Pacific Railway. They were built for the US Army in 1942 and 1944, intended for use overseas during World War II, and after the war, they were sold off as surplus and served as terminal switchers in Vancouver, British Columbia until 1965. Because they were intended for military service, they have several visible design changes from the other USRA copies. These changes include a shorter smokestack, a cowcatcher (standard USRA 0-6-0s had footboard pilots), a front-mounted air pump, and a much smaller (and vertically offset) smokebox door, among other minor differences.

References 

 
 
 
 
 

0-6-0 locomotives
USRA locomotives
ALCO locomotives
Baldwin locomotives
Standard gauge locomotives of Canada
Standard gauge locomotives of the United States
Shunting locomotives
Railway locomotives introduced in 1918